Johannes Bloemen (26 May 1864 – 15 March 1939) was a Dutch swimmer. He competed in the men's 200 metre backstroke at the 1900 Summer Olympics.

References

External links
 

1864 births
1939 deaths
Dutch male backstroke swimmers
Olympic swimmers of the Netherlands
Swimmers at the 1900 Summer Olympics
Swimmers from Amsterdam